Sääse (Estonian for "Gnat") is a subdistrict in the district of Mustamäe, Tallinn, the capital of Estonia. It has a population of 8,881.

Gallery

References

Subdistricts of Tallinn